The Indianapolis mayoral election of 1979 took place on November 6, 1979 and saw the reelection of Republican William H. Hudnut III.

Hudnut defeated Democratic former city-county councilman Paul Cantwell in what was reported to have been the greatest margin of defeat for a Democratic candidate in an Indianapolis mayoral election in 150 years. Cantwell had resigned his City-County Council seat to focus on his campaign.

Ahead of the election season, Hudnut had demonstrated a strong advantage in polls. Top prospective Democratic candidates declined to run.

Cantwell struggled to raise funds, ultimately raising only $38,000. Hudnut, meanwhile, spent $278,000 dollars during his campaign.

At the time of the election, Cantwell's son Danny Cantwell was awaiting trial for murder. He would be acquitted in November 1980. Paul Cantwell argued that the charges were political, and were retribution for his investigations of police corruption.

Results

References

1979
1979 United States mayoral elections
1979 Indiana elections